Robert L. Joynt (May 22, 1845 – November 4, 1931) was an Ontario merchant and political figure. He represented Grenville in the Legislative Assembly of Ontario from 1898 to 1904 as a Conservative member.

He was born in New Boyne, Leeds County, Canada West, the son of Irish immigrants. Joynt was reeve for Augusta Township from 1891 to 1895 and warden for the United Counties of Leeds and Grenville in 1895. He married Margaret Donovan in 1874. He died in 1931.

References 

 Canadian Parliamentary Guide, 1901, AJ Magurn

External links 

1845 births
1931 deaths
Progressive Conservative Party of Ontario MPPs